Paw san hmwe (also spelt paw san hmwe and known as Pearl Paw San or Myanmar pearl rice) is a high-grade variety of aromatic rice (fragrant rice) grown in Myanmar. Paw hsan hmwe is known for its good cooking quality, fragrant aroma, texture, good milling recovery, and substantial grain elongation during the cooking process. The medium-length grains of this rice variety can elongate up to three times in length while cooking. Paw hsan hmwe has intermediate amylose content, higher than jasmine rice, contributing to its hardness quality in line with Burmese consumer preferences. Myanmar's Paw San rice is one of the world's most recognized high quality rice, it was awarded the world's best rice at the Rice Trader's World Rice Conference in 2011. Paw San rice has a similar aroma, grain quality and eating quality to the reputable aromatic rice varieties of the world, namely Basmati of India and Pakistan and Jasmine of Thailand. It has a strong aroma similar to Jasmine rice and the fluffiness and elongation-up to 3 times after cooking of Basmati rice. Despite these qualities, Paw San rice has not made it to the export market due to its low yield. As well, a high domestic demand leaves little to export. The low yield has been an important barrier to its wider adoption; only about 6% of the area under rice cultivation was planted to Paw San in 2013. In order to meet export target and increase export value, Myanmar would need to promote the wider adoption of Paw San rice. To support the campaign for adoption, the county also would need to develop the infrastructure and the technology to increase productivity.

Varieties 
Paw hsan hmwe is a variety of Oryza sativa. Paw hsan hmwe is the market name for two varieties of paw hsan rice, namely paw hsan gyi, also known as Shwebo paw hsan, and paw hsan yin.  The former variety is photoperiod sensitive and retains its aroma for up to 2 years with proper harvesting and storage, while the latter is non-photoperiod sensitive and possesses a strong aroma that fades after 5–6 months.  Paw hsan gyi was developed in 1944 using pure line selection of the paw hsan rice varieties.

Production and cultivation 
Paw hsan hmwe is largely cultivated in the Irrawaddy delta region of Myanmar. Since the mid-2000s, cultivation has expanded to Upper Myanmar.

See also 
 List of rice varieties
 Basmati
 Jasmine rice

References 

Burmese cuisine
Rice varieties
Rice production